The White Nights (also known as St. Petersburg White Nights) is an open international badminton tournament in Russia. This tournament is a BWF International Challenge level and part of Badminton Europe circuit.

Previous winners

Performances by nation

References

External links 
 White Nights 2011

Badminton tournaments in Russia
Sport in Leningrad Oblast